Frank Gordon "Limb" McKenry (August 13, 1888 – November 1, 1956), nicknamed "Big Pete", was a pitcher in Major League Baseball. He played for the Cincinnati Reds. On November 1, 1956, McKenry committed suicide with a shotgun in his apartment in Fresno, California.

References

External links

1888 births
1956 suicides
Major League Baseball pitchers
Cincinnati Reds players
Baseball players from Tennessee
Los Angeles Angels (minor league) players
Richmond Climbers players
Sacramento Senators players
Oakland Oaks (baseball) players
People from Sullivan County, Tennessee
Suicides by firearm in California